Atoka is an unincorporated community in Fauquier County, Virginia, United States.

The Atoka Historic District, which is listed on the National Register of Historic Places, is located in Atoka.  The Goose Creek Stone Bridge is located near Atoka in Loudoun County, Virginia.

References

Unincorporated communities in Fauquier County, Virginia
Unincorporated communities in Virginia